Keiferia rusposoria is a moth in the family Gelechiidae. It was described by Povolný in 1970. It is found in the West Indies, where it has been recorded from Grenada.

References

Keiferia
Moths described in 1970